Radio Edits is the second EP of the Italian melodic metal band Dimmi Argus.  The EP contains 7 songs from the previous full-length album of the band Bad Dream.

Track listing
 Black And White (EP radio edit)  4:43
 From the grave  (radio edit) 4:32
 Wish I Could  (radio edit)  4:21
 My Way Home  (radio edit)  3:54
 Bad Dream  (alternative guitar solo)  3:47
 From the grave  (alternative radio edit) 4:00
 This Silence  (instrumental mix)  5:00

Personnel
 Dimmi Argus – vocals, backing vocals, keyboards
 Matteo Calza – guitars, backing vocals
 Filippo Spezia – bass, backing vocals 
 Andrea Cassinari – drums

Production
 Daniele Mandelli – mixing
 Timo Tolkki – mastering

External links
 Dimmi Argus's Official Site
 Tanzan Music's Official Site

2014 EPs
Dimmi Argus albums